John Henry Williams (21 December 1918 – 12 December 1975) was a New Zealand politician of the Labour Party.

Biography

Early life
Williams was born in Lawrence, Otago on 21 December 1918. His family moved north and he was educated at Kurow. Upon completing his education he moved to the Wairarapa region and took up farming in the town of Bideford.

During World War II Williams enlisted in the New Zealand Army. He served in both Egypt and Italy rising to the rank of sergeant-major by the end of the war. After the war he returned to farming in Bideford and was allocated a 1,000 acre rehabilitation farm section, but later moved to farm at Te Ore Ore, near Masterton, instead. He later became a farming equipment salesman. He was also an executive member of the Masterton Secondary Schools' Board of Governors.

Political career

Williams was for many years a member of the Masterton Licensing Trust. In 1974 he stood unsuccessfully for the role of Labour's junior whip. His majority in 1969 was 467 votes, and in 1972 was 1,086 votes.

In the  he was defeated by Ben Couch. During the middle of the 1975 election campaign he was admitted to hospital with a serious heart condition, after collapsing, leaving him little opportunity to campaign. His wife Chriss said that long hours, local duties to constituents and late at night debates at Parliament led him to often return home greatly fatigued which contributed to his collapse. After spending four weeks in hospital he was discharged before being readmitted once again before finally being released to recuperate at home.

Death
He died shortly after the election at his home in Masterton, aged 56 years. The Masterton Licensing Trust instructed hotels to close early on the day of his funeral as a mark of respect for his service. A notification of Williams' death was the first message Bill Rowling received after moving in to the office of Leader of the Opposition.

References

1918 births
1975 deaths
New Zealand farmers
New Zealand military personnel of World War II
New Zealand Labour Party MPs
Members of the New Zealand House of Representatives
New Zealand MPs for North Island electorates
Unsuccessful candidates in the 1975 New Zealand general election
Unsuccessful candidates in the 1966 New Zealand general election
Unsuccessful candidates in the 1963 New Zealand general election
People from Lawrence, New Zealand